The Founders and activists of the Pakistan Movement, also known as Founding Fathers of Pakistan (Urdu:بانيڹ پاكستان; Romanization lit.:bəŋɨaɪaɪ-e-Pəkɨstəŋ), were the political leaders and statespersons who participated in the success of the political movement, following the signing of the Pakistan Resolution, that led the establishment and creation of the independent Pakistan on August 1947. Within this large group, a further and extended subset signed the Objective Resolution that was annexed to the Constitution of Pakistan in 1950.

The term was first used by the linguist and archeologist Dr. Ahmad Hasan Dani's book, the Founding Fathers of Pakistan (1998), which popularized the term in literary activities of the country. The Pakistan Movement was led by a large group of activists and statesmen who played crucial role in the politics of the British Indian Empire in 1930s and 1940s. More recently, the term was used by the government officially in explaining the foreign policy text. Authors and historians of Pakistan more broadly define the term "Founding Fathers" to mean a larger group which also includes all those who, whether as politicians, jurists, statesperson, soldiers, diplomats, academicians, or ordinary citizens, took part in winning the independence of four provinces in the north-west region of British India from the control of the United Kingdom and also from the influence of the Indian Congress; this creating Pakistan.

The following is a list of people who played a prominent role in making of Pakistan as independence activists, leaders, freedom fighters and revolutionaries.

Historical background

In 1905, the Bengal presidency's partition was decided by the English government which separated the largely Muslim eastern areas from the largely Hindu western areas was supported by the Muslims communities.  The success of the Swadeshi movement led by Indian activists led the reintegrating the presidency and it was a catalyst in making the Muslims reformers of India realize the need for a separate homeland.

During the same year, the political efforts and initiations led by Sir Syed Ahmad Khan led the establishment of the historic All-India Muslim League (AIML) to protect the interests and rights of the Muslim regions in the subcontinent. Mutual distrust among the Hindu leaders and Muslim reformers further grew. A conference held as well as chaired by Indian Viceroy, Early Minto, the Hindu-Muslim conflict was raised to the constitutional plane. In 1906, an annual meeting of Muhammadan Educational Conference was held in Dhaka led by Nawab Sir  Khwaja Salimullh Banhadur, Nawab Vikar-ul-Mulk, Sir Sultan Mahomed Shah, Aga Khan III and 3,000 other delegates attended the session making it the largest-ever representative gathering of Muslim India. Muslim cleric Ali Johar wrote All-India Muslim League's first agenda and Syed Ameer Ali established its European branch in the United Kingdom.

For some quiet time, the Muslim League worked on its reputation and credibility against the much influential Indian Congress. It was not until when Liaquat Ali Khan and his companion Shrene Pant convinced Muhammad Ali Jinnah and among others to join the Muslim League in 1930s. The philosophical idea, Pakistan (Iqbal, 1930); the 14 points (Jinnah, 1929); the Now or Never (Ali, 1933); the Two-nation theory which was subsequently contributed and worked by many activists and leaders played a crucial role in gaining the creation of Pakistan in 1947. Ashraf Ali Thanwi's disciples Shabbir Ahmad Usmani and Zafar Ahmad Usmani were key players in religious support for the creation of Pakistan.

The newly founded country of Pakistan had to create a government and legislature to replace the British India government and the British Parliament.  The founding fathers of Pakistan first established the partial Constituent Assembly (which was replaced with Parliament), and adopted the Objectives Resolution was annexed to the Constitution of Pakistan.

Occupations and finances

The founders and activists as well had different occupations and practiced a wide range of high and middle-status occupations, and many pursued more than one career simultaneously. However, the more influential founding fathers were trained and professional barristers and lawyers. Notable activist, Sir Dr. Ziauddin Ahmed, was a mathematician who helped forming in the first educational policy of the country. Ra'ana Ali Khan was an economist; and Abu Bakr Ahmad, a political scientist; M.M. Sharif, a philosopher; and Shaukat Hyatt Khan, an officer in the British Army, are the quiet few notable personalities who played an integrated role in the movement.

List of Founders of Pakistan

Notable activists
The activities and constant public gathering of founding fathers of Pakistan attracted the people of North-West India to be politically active in the movement. Many of the activists would later becoming the future leader of the country.

See also
 Pakistan
 Dominion of Pakistan
 Muhammad Ali Jinnah
 Indian independence activists
 List of presidents of the All-India Muslim League

References

Lists of Pakistani people
Pakistan history-related lists
 
Leaders of the Pakistan Movement
Lists of activists